The Philippine Guarantee Corporation (PHILGUARANTEE) is a Government-owned and controlled corporation attached to the Department of Finance. Formerly known as the Philippine Export-Import Credit Agency or PhilEXIM, is the principal agency for State Guarantee Finance of the Philippines. The primary objective is to perform development financing roles through the provision of credit guarantees in support of trade and investments, exports, infrastructure, energy, tourism, agricultural business, modernization, housing, MSMEs (Micro, Small and Medium Enterprises) and other priority sectors of the economy, with the end in view of facilitating and promoting socio-economic and regional development.

PHILGUARANTEE is the result of the merger and consolidation of five Philippine Guarantee Programs and Agencies (PGPAs) pursuant to Executive Order No. 58, series of 2018.

History
The organization was originally created by Presidential Decree (PD 1080) on January 31, 1977, under the name Philippine Export and Foreign Loan Guarantee Corporation (PHILGUARANTEE) to provide guarantees and facilitate the entry of foreign loans for development projects. On February 12, 1998, its area of operation was expanded and its name accordingly changed to Trade and Investment Development Corporation of the Philippines (TIDCORP) by Republic Act No. 8494. It was re-titled again through an Executive Order (EO 85) on March 18, 2002, to Philippine Export-Import Credit Agency (PhilEXIM).

On July 23, 2018, President Duterte approved the merger of the Home Guaranty Corporation and the Philippine Export-Import Credit Agency (PhilEXIM) to prevent operational redundancies, standardize policies, facilitate timely approvals, and lower administrative costs. The order transferred the guarantee functions, programs, and funds of the Small Business Corporation and the administration of the Agricultural Guarantee Fund Pool and the Industrial Guarantee and Loan Fund to the PhilExim, the surviving entity in the amalgamation of the five Philippine Guarantee Programs and Agencies (PGPAs). It also authorized capital stock of the PhilExim to be increased from Php10 billion to Php50 billion while the equity contributions of the national government to the HGC, IGLF, and AGFP will be transferred to the PhilExim to form part of its paid-up capital. To reflect the centralized nature of the merged guarantee functions, the PhilEXIM was renamed as Philippine Guarantee Corporation or PHILGUARANTEE.

References

Department of Finance (Philippines)
Government-owned and controlled corporations of the Philippines
Export credit agencies
Foreign trade of the Philippines
Establishments by Philippine presidential decree